Slovenia women's national under-17 football team represents Slovenia in international youth football competitions.

FIFA U-17 Women's World Cup

The team has never qualified for the  FIFA U-17 Women's World Cup

UEFA Women's Under-17 Championship

The team has never qualified

See also
Slovenia women's national football team

References

External links

U17
Youth football in Slovenia
Women's national under-17 association football teams